Apocalypse (En Sabah Nur) is a supervillain appearing in comic books published by Marvel Comics. He is one of the world's first mutants, and was a principal villain for the original X-Factor team and now for the X-Men and related spin-off teams. Created by writer Louise Simonson and artist Jackson Guice, Apocalypse first appeared in X-Factor #5 (June 1986). Apocalypse is one of the most powerful beings in the Marvel Universe.

Since his introduction, the character has appeared in a number of X-Men titles, including spin-offs and several limited series. Apocalypse has also been featured in various forms of media. Oscar Isaac portrayed the character in X-Men: Apocalypse.

Conception and creation
While writing the first five issues of X-Factor, Bob Layton dropped hints of a villain operating behind the scenes and leading the Alliance of Evil (mentioned in X-Factor #4, May 1986). Layton intended to reveal this character to be the Daredevil villain the Owl on the final page of X-Factor #5. However, Layton left the book after writing this issue and was replaced by writer Louise Simonson. Editor Bob Harras said that the character arose because of storytelling needs: "All I had communicated to Louise was my desire that an A-level, first class character be introduced. I wanted a Magneto-level villain who would up the stakes and give the X-Factor team reason to exist."

In a 2011 interview with The Philadelphia Inquirer, Simonson explained that when the X-Factor series was created, the original five X-Men were pulled out of the purview of Chris Claremont, who was writing The Uncanny X-Men. However, Simonson felt that the series needed an archenemy, or what Simonson called "a big, bad villain", and conceived of Apocalypse. Simonson described the character thus:

 "When X-Factor was created, it caused a split in the "Mutant World" [and] several seminal characters were pulled out of [writer] Chris Claremont's X-Men."

"Apocalypse is the first mutant – a brilliant shape-shifter who is virtually immortal – and sees himself as the father of mutantkind…In his early years, which I covered in the X-Factor Forever miniseries . . . Apocalypse encountered the Celestials and realized there was a time when humanity might be judged unworthy and destroyed. Consequently, he's been using Darwinian principles – survival of the fittest – to kill off the weak and force the survivors to grow stronger, to push humanity to get better and more powerful. He considers himself the Apocalypse of modern man and the father of what humanity will come next – Mutantkind. Where Magneto sees mutants as the next step of evolution and strives to protect all mutants, Apocalypse believes in absolute survival of the fittest – so if the Hulk, for example, is stronger than [the X-Men's] Colossus...well, in Apocalypse's world he would say, 'Bye, bye, comrade.'"

Harras also commented, "As soon as I saw the sketch by Walter [Simonson] and heard Louise's take on him, I knew we had the character I wanted. Jackson [Guice] redrew the page, patching in the shadowy Apocalypse where the Owl had been. But the genesis was clearly Walt and Weezie's." Guice admitted to difficulty recalling the details behind redrawing the last page of issue #5: "The best I can remember now is putting his look together pretty much right on the pencil page—just adding bits of costuming business which hinted toward his true appearance when we'd eventually see him in full reveal. I don't believe there was even a character sketch done for him at that point—I planned on making sense of it all later on, but by then I was gone and others had that concern." Apocalypse's silhouette in issue #5 does not match up with his full appearance in issue #6, suggesting the possibility that Guice was using Simonson's sketch as a reference for issue #6 but did not have access to it earlier, necessitating that he come up with his own design for issue #5. Walter Simonson himself has downplayed his role in the character's creation, saying that Guice was responsible for creating the design and that he, Simonson, merely modified it later: "I did not co-create Apocalypse. However, I wish I had. Louise Simonson and Jackson Guice created him. He appeared in a few panels at the end of one of Jackson’s last X-FACTORs, so I am the first artist to use him extensively in stories. And I kind of juiced up his physique a bit."

Bob Harras said on the character of Apocalypse:

Although the character first appeared in 1986, he was retroactively said to have been present during previously published stories. The unnamed benefactor of the Living Monolith in Marvel Graphic Novel #17 (1985) was later identified as Apocalypse in disguise. Classic X-Men #25 revealed that years earlier, Apocalypse encountered the terrorist Moses Magnum and granted him superhuman power.

During his run on Cable, Robert Weinberg planned a story to reveal that Apocalypse was the third Summers brother, a mysterious sibling to the mutants Cyclops and Havok. But Weinberg left the book before he could go along with his plan and the third Summers brother was revealed to be the mutant Gabriel Summers, a.k.a. Vulcan.

Apocalypse was the principal adversary in the mid-1980s X-Men spin-off series X-Factor (1986–91) until being apparently killed at the climax of issue #68 (July 1991). Since then, the character has died and been resurrected several times thanks to his power and advanced alien technology. His name En Sabah Nur was revealed in Cable #6 (December 1993) and his birthplace (Egypt) and the origin of his technology, were revealed in X-Force #37 (August 1994). According to Marvel, the name translates from Arabic as "The First One" (although, in reality, the translation is considered grammatically incorrect, as it means "The First/Morning Light" [En-("The") + Sabah- ("Morning") + Nur- ("Light")] ). It is later revealed in the origin story Rise of Apocalypse that he is possibly the first mutant (meaning, in this case, a human being born with the X-gene), born 5,000 years ago. The character gained greater popularity in 1995 when the storyline "Age of Apocalypse" featured an alternate timeline in which Apocalypse has conquered much of planet Earth.
 
The character was reincarnated in the pages of Uncanny X-Force #1 as a small boy with no memory of his previous incarnation. The boy was named Evan Sabahnur. In 2012 the adult, villainous version of Apocalypse returned in the series Uncanny Avengers. His origins are further explored in the storyline "Apocalypse Wars".

In 2019, writers Jonathan Hickman and Tini Howard expanded upon Apocalypse's origin and agenda in the Excalibur series and the X of Swords event. Apocalypse's 'survival of the fittest' mentality was revealed to have had the aim of preparing the mutant population for a dangerous reunion with the long-lost mutants of Arakko, which included his wife and four children, the original Horsemen of Apocalypse.

Fictional character biography

Rise of Apocalypse

The being who would later be called Apocalypse was born thousands of years ago in Aqaba. He was born with the mutant X-gene. Because of his grey skin and blue lips, his people abandoned him as an infant. He was rescued by Baal of the Sandstormers who saw the child's potential power and will to survive. Baal named him En Sabah Nur, which Marvel translates as "The First One". The Sandstormers lived by the credo of survival of the fittest, believing that only those who are strong enough to survive hardship and direct conflict are worthy of life. It is also revealed during the Apocalypse Wars that, while still a young boy, En Sabah Nur was very generous and selfless, to the chagrin of Baal. A time-displaced Evan Sabah Nur and All-New X-Men Beast tried to save En Sabah Nur, but he allowed himself to be captured to help them escape.

Around this time, the time-traveller Kang the Conqueror arrived in Egypt and assumed the identity of Pharaoh Rama-Tut. Knowing who En Sabah Nur was fated to become and where he was, Rama-Tut sent his General Ozymandias and an army to destroy the Sandstormers and find the young Apocalypse. En Sabah Nur and Baal were injured and sought refuge in a cave. Before he died, Baal revealed advanced alien technology hidden in the cave, left behind by the deity-like aliens known as Celestials. Vowing revenge on Rama-Tut, En Sabah Nur entered the Pharaoh's city posing as a slave and drew the romantic attention of Ozymandias's sister, Nephri. On seeing the mutant's true appearance, Nephri rejected him and turned to her brother for protection. Heartbroken, En Sabah Nur's rage caused his mutant abilities to fully emerge. Rampaging, he renamed himself Apocalypse. Rama-Tut fled and En Sabah Nur used the Celestial technology to transform his former tormentor Ozymandias into a blind clairvoyant made of living stone, now enslaved to Apocalypse. As the years went on, Apocalypse found he no longer aged.

It is revealed in the series S.H.I.E.L.D. that Apocalypse, at some point in the days of Ancient Egypt, joined forces with the Brotherhood of the Shield to successfully fend off a Brood invasion. Also present were Imhotep and a man who was either the moon god called Khonshu or his first Moon Knight avatar/champion.

Early history
As the millennia pass, Apocalypse travels around planet Earth, convincing civilizations that he is a deity (inspiring different myths as a result) and manipulating them into fighting wars. He justifies that this encourages "growth, judgment, and destruction". Apocalypse's progeny become the Clan Akkaba. Apocalypse encounters the near-immortal human offshoot race known as Eternals, primarily the members Ikaris and Sersi, who refer to him as their "Ancient Nemesis". At different points, Apocalypse uses his Celestial technology to enter periods of suspended animation, leaving Clan Akkaba and Ozymandias to act in his stead.

In 1013 AD, Apocalypse seeks to destroy the Asgardian Thor, who he knows will cause him trouble in the future, according to information obtained from Rama-Tut, yet the plans are foiled by Odin. In the 12th century, Apocalypse encounters the Eternal Sersi again while awakening latent mutant powers in a crusader named Bennet du Paris, also known as Exodus. In 1459, Apocalypse defeats Vlad Tepes (Vlad the Impaler) in Romania, who later becomes the vampire more popularly known as Count Dracula.

In 1859, Apocalypse encounters British scientist Nathaniel Essex and learns more about the nature of mutants. Apocalypse uses his Celestial technology to transform Essex into the superhuman being Mister Sinister. He then coerces Sinister and the Hellfire Club into aiding his plans for global conquest, but Sinister concludes that these plans are madness and betrays Apocalypse, forcing him back into hibernation. In 1897, Count Dracula attacks the Clan Akkaba in revenge for his defeat at Apocalypse's hands, forcing the Clan to revive their master from suspended animation. Apocalypse defeats the vampire again, this time with help from Abraham Van Helsing. Eventually, Apocalypse enters hibernation again, expecting to remain so for possibly two centuries, by which point mutants should be more common on Earth.

Modern era

After many years of suspended animation, Apocalypse awakens nearly a century earlier than planned due to the arrival of the time-traveling mutant Cable (ironically, Cable had traveled to this point in time hoping to prevent the ancient mutant from awakening). Apocalypse decides the Earth is ready for further examination and testing. He grants superhuman powers to the terrorist known as Moses Magnum, who then tests the X-Men and the Avengers. Apocalypse later briefly employs the Alliance of Evil to capture the mutant Michael Nowlan, who can boost the power of other mutants. This plan brings Apocalypse into direct conflict with the first incarnation of X-Factor, when the team comprised the original X-Men.

Apocalypse then recruits mutants to serve as his personal guard, known as the Four Horsemen. Among them is Angel, AKA Warren Worthington III, whom Apocalypse has corrupted and turned into a cyborg called Death. Warren Worthington regains his identity and helps his friends defeat Apocalypse, adopting the new codename Archangel. Apocalypse escapes with his new recruit, the Morlock called Caliban, while X-Factor then takes his Celestial spaceship as a base.

During The Evolutionary War, the High Evolutionary plans to rid the Earth of those he feels are preventing evolution. Believing this disrupts the natural order and his own plans, Apocalypse battles the High Evolutionary. Following the genetic manipulation of Caliban, Apocalypse declines an alliance with the Asgardian villain Loki and other villains conspiring to unleash "Acts of Vengeance". This results in a brief fight between Apocalypse and Loki.

Sins of the Futures

Apocalypse learns of Sinister's intention to create an adversary powerful enough to destroy him: Nathan Christopher Charles Summers, the son of Scott Summers and Madelyne Pryor. Apocalypse, viewing him as a threat and realizing that Nathan's energy is the very energy that awoke him all those months earlier, sends his newly formed group, the Riders of the Storm, to abduct the Summers child. Apocalypse at this time had conquered the city of Attilan, home of the Inhumans, as well as enslaved part of its population. X-Factor, alongside the Inhuman Royal Family, attacks Apocalypse's lunar stronghold. Although Apocalypse is severely defeated, the young Nathan is infected with a techno-organic virus and is sent to the future with a woman named Askani to be cured.

In the future, Apocalypse has conquered the Earth and ruled until the 39th century. By this time, Apocalypse's body had grown feeble: he becomes aware of the young Nathan's presence in this time, but only succeeds in kidnapping a clone of the child which Askani created. Apocalypse plans to transfer his consciousness and power into the clone's stronger body, but perishes in combat with the (real) teenage Nathan. Nathan grows up to become the warrior Cable (while his clone grows up to become the mutant terrorist known as Stryfe) and travels back to the past to prevent Apocalypse's future domination of the planet.

In the present, Apocalypse is prematurely awoken from his regeneration chamber by his Riders (now calling themselves The Dark Riders), who inform their master that his Horsemen have kidnapped Cyclops and Jean Grey, supposedly under his instructions (in actuality, Mister Sinister, who was posing as Apocalypse). When attempting to rejuvenate himself again, Apocalypse is nearly killed by Stryfe who had arrived in the past to take revenge on Apocalypse. After a battle on the Moon with his former servants, the Dark Riders (who had joined Stryfe), Apocalypse is left for dead by Archangel.

The Dark Riders' new leader, Genesis (the adopted son of Cable, who had traveled to the present to ensure Apocalypse's rise and exact revenge on his father), plans to resurrect Apocalypse by sacrificing the lives of the people in villages neighboring Akkaba. During this time, Wolverine is held captive by Genesis, who attempts to restore Wolverine's lost adamantium skeleton and turn him into a Horseman as a gift for Apocalypse. Wolverine breaks free and kills Genesis along with nearly all of the Dark Riders. Genesis had built a sarcophagus with Apocalypse's likeness (which is empty, since Apocalypse had already revived).

Further schemes
After a long healing slumber, Apocalypse, fully restored, awakens with Ozymandias at his side and quickly learns of the present danger: Onslaught. He observes the conflict between the psionic entity and Earth's heroes with Uatu the Watcher, who suggests to Apocalypse a course of action: an alliance with the one who hated him the most, Cable. Apocalypse surmises that Onslaught will be most vulnerable through the astral plane and that he needs Cable for actual physical transportation to this realm. Once on the astral plane, Apocalypse removes the captive Franklin Richards, greatly weakening Onslaught. The plan succeeds, but is interrupted by the Invisible Woman, who had invisibly accompanied the pair, having suspected Apocalypse's motive in wanting to actually kill her son. However, the reprieve in battle gave Onslaught the time to escape, prolonging the conflict.

Following the events of the Onslaught saga, the gamma-spawned powerhouse, the Hulk and his human alter ego, Banner, are split into two separate entities: Hulk now draws upon energy derived from Franklin Richards' pocket universe. Apocalypse recruits the Hulk to become his Horseman, War, with intentions of using the Hulk's nexus-energy to overcome the Celestials. To test this newest recruit, Apocalypse set War against the New World Order, a shadow cabinet organization that intends to conquer the planet. The New World Order in turn set the Juggernaut and the Absorbing Man against War, but both are easily defeated. Hulk comes to his senses after injuring his friend, Rick Jones. Despite this apparent setback, the incident was still a victory for Apocalypse as it was a successful testing of newly understood Celestial technology. Apocalypse activates the self-destruct mechanism on the sword of War, which the New World Order had obtained, destroying their headquarters.

The Hellfire Club later awakens Apocalypse's long-hidden Harbinger from its deep sleep: originally a normal man, whom Apocalypse in the 19th century once left to incubate for 100 years. Apocalypse releases his Horseman (Caliban) and his scribe Ozymandias from his possession, to fend for themselves, if they were to survive the coming events. Cable with the Avengers battles the Harbinger, but are unable to stop it. Apocalypse then appears, activating a bomb inside the Harbinger intended to destroy all of New York, but Cable manages to prevent this disaster.

When Magneto is disrupting Earth's magnetic field, Apocalypse sends a Skrull impersonating the mutant Astra (having dealt with the original Astra) to stop the Master of Magnetism.

Intending to start an all-out war between the humans and the subterranean-dwelling Deviants as part of his plan to test the strong, Apocalypse sets off nuclear warheads at Lemuria, causing the Deviants to further mutate (which also restores Ikaris' father Virako to life). Apocalypse launches an attack at San Francisco, using a mentally controlled Deviant, Karkas, now a gigantic monster, that the Eternals are forced to battle. Apocalypse is confronted by his centuries-old foe, Ikaris, who now is a Prime Eternal. Although Apocalypse defeats Ikaris, the Eternal still succeeds in destroying his ship and thwarting his plan.

The Twelve

Supposedly lost diaries of the mutant seer Destiny surfaced, telling of twelve beings that could defeat Apocalypse once and for all. Various mutants, all listed in the prophecy, are abducted by Apocalypse's Horsemen including a faction of the Skrulls. The Twelve legend was in fact a ruse, orchestrated by Apocalypse himself: once the Twelve are assembled, Apocalypse intended to use them to transform himself into a deitylike entity beyond the Celestials. It is revealed at the end of this story arc that Apocalypse's physical form has been burned out due to the vast amount of energies he has under his control, forcing him to wear a bio-armor (like his future counterpart) and now plans to use Nate Grey as a host body for him to move his energy and consciousness into. The X-Men confront Apocalypse as he is close to merging with Nate, but are unable to stop him. Cyclops pushes Nate Grey out of the way, merging with Apocalypse instead. While the merge is successful, Apocalypse's aim for unlimited power is not and he attempts to complete the transformation by warping reality into various scenarios (see Ages of Apocalypse). Apocalypse hoped to lure the Twelve into empowering him with their energy, but eventually, the mutants realize their true predicament and Apocalypse teleports away.

An amnesiac and powerless cyborg Cyclops regains control of the merged form, but Apocalypse begins to re-emerge. Jean and Cable are alerted to his location in Egypt, where Jean in the end manages to free Cyclops by telepathically tearing out Apocalypse's essence from her husband's body, rendering Apocalypse in an incorporeal astral form, which Cable apparently destroys using his Psimitar.

2000s
In the aftermath of the 2005 "Decimation" storyline, in which most of the mutants lost their powers, Apocalypse was revealed to be alive and well. The techno-organic virus, with which he long ago infected Cable, was revealed to be the means by which Apocalypse's spirit reconstituted itself. With only a drop of his blood into a vat of organs and blood, the virus rewrote the genetic code of the material within to form a body for Apocalypse. Apocalypse awakes from a slumber in a tomb in Akkaba, recalling:

Across the world—helpless mutants slaughtered. Pogroms. Horror. ...Something has woken me from my slumber. Once, a sudden surge in worldwide mutant power stirred me from a similar sleep. Now—a plummet in global mutant capacity—has opened my eyes.

Apocalypse finds himself on a planet with its mutant population reduced to a fraction of what it had been, only a few hundred remaining out of the millions who populated earth prior to his demise at Cable's hands. Reappearing inside a Sphinx-shaped ship, Apocalypse confronts the X-Men with his newly assembled cadre of Horsemen on the front lawn of the X-Mansion. The Horseman Famine uses his powers to cause an intense feeling of hunger and weakness in the mutants and humans on the institute grounds. Apocalypse offers the mutants an elixir: his own blood, provided they join his side. Bent on becoming the new messiah for mutant-kind, Apocalypse approaches the Earth leaders at the United Nations in New York and issues an ultimatum: humanity would destroy ninety percent of its own population, putting man and mutant on level ground in anticipation of the final conflict when the worthy alone would survive – or Apocalypse would unleash his meta-plague on the planet and obliterate all humanity.

In the end, Apocalypse's horsemen are lost, Ozymandias betrays him, and he is forced to retreat by a combined assault of the X-Men and the Avengers. Ultimately, it is discovered that the Celestials lent their technology to Apocalypse, requiring as payment greater sufferings later. He attempts to embrace death as an escape from his lifelong pact, only to find himself instantly resurrected and hearing a voice: "We cannot let you die. Not yet. It is time Apocalypse… it is time".

2010s
Apocalypse's followers, the Clan Akkaba, manage to bring about Apocalypse's return, albeit in the form of a child they will indoctrinate. Upon learning of Apocalypse's return, X-Force seeks to kill him, but when they discover he is a child, Psylocke decides to protect him, believing they can rehabilitate him and train him as a force for good. To the shock of the rest of the team, Fantomex fatally shoots the child.

In a 2011 storyline, as X-Force succeed in stopping the Deathloks inside the World, the home of all Weapon projects, it is revealed that Ultimaton, guardian of the World, is keeping watch over an incubating young boy labeled En Sabah Nur, aged 847 days.

During the 2012 storyline "Dark Angel Saga", it is revealed that Apocalypse had fathered a son with Autumn Rolfson and she kept this a secret from Apocalypse out of fear of what he would do to him. At the end of the storyline, it is revealed that Fantomex creates a clone Apocalypse which he helps raise to the age of a teenager in an artificial world, where the clone knows Fantomex as the kindly "Uncle Cluster" who taught him to use his abilities for good. The boy, code-named Genesis, helps X-force fight Archangel and when the battle is over, Fantomex enrolls him in the Jean Grey School for Higher Learning.

Evan Sabahnur
In Wolverine & the X-Men #4 (March 2012), Evan Sabahnur a.k.a. Genesis is admitted as a student to the Jean Grey School of Higher Learning, where his classmates notice his resemblance to Apocalypse. En is worried when a visiting Deathlok, who reveals to the students their likely futures, shows reluctance to do so with Evan. When Evan presses him, Deathlok informs him that this is what Evan is at the school to discover. Deathlok then tells Wolverine that Evan has great potential and may be a great savior, or a conqueror.

After being called Kid Apocalypse by Kid Omega, Evan begins learning about Apocalypse and is saddened that he himself looks like the villain, raising the possibility of a future that Evan rejects. After saving Angel and discovering that he possesses the ability to see the essence of those he looks upon, Evan asks him to tell him what he sees when he looks at him. Angel tells Evan he sees only goodness inside him, which makes Evan happy, so he thanks Angel for being a good friend. In fact, Angel lied, as the only thing he could see was the dark image of Apocalypse.

A new Brotherhood of Evil Mutants, led by Wolverine's son Daken, kidnaps Evan during a field trip to Genosha's remains. Hoping to sway the boy into becoming Apocalypse, the Brotherhood reveals to him that he is a clone and tells him of X-Force's assassination of the child En Sabah Nur from which he was cloned and the falsehood of his life under the tutelage of Fantomex. After the Brotherhood reveals that they have killed Fantomex and further tortures Evan, Daken tells En that he has a choice: either immediately ascend as Apocalypse and kill the Brotherhood as revenge for the death of "Uncle Cluster", or let the rest of X-Force die at the Brotherhood's hands to avenge the death of the original boy En Sabah Nur and to prevent X-Force from killing Evan the way they killed Apocalypse and Archangel.

Daken offers Evan a suit of Apocalypse's Celestial armor to do with what he will, secretly planning to control the new Apocalypse through the psychic abilities of the Shadow King. After Deadpool's failed attempt to rescue Evan, the boy dons the Celestial armor to prevent Wolverine's death at Daken's hands and nearly kills Brotherhood members Sabretooth and Mystique. Enraged by the lies he has been told and filled with new-found power from Apocalypse's armor, Evan prepares to attack Wolverine himself, but Wolverine convinces him of the ultimate futility of revenge. Evan is later visited by Deadpool at the Jean Grey School for Higher Learning. Deadpool tells Evan he is not Apocalypse and that Deadpool will always be there for him when he needs him.

Later Deadpool enlists Evan and Quentin's help to help him saving his daughter Eleanor Camacho from the Flag-Smasher, with Evan promising Quentin a bloodbath and some action to motivate him. He manages to save Ellie's life and proposes Deadpool to let Quentin erase from the girl's mind every memory of the ordeal. Deadpool loudly refuses and to Evan's surprise, he hugs him and tells him to stay in school.

During the 2014 "AXIS" storyline, Evan is one of many mutants captured by the Red Skull on the island of Genosha. During a fierce battle between the Avengers, the united X-Men, as well as a group of villains who all attempt to defeat the Red Onslaught, Evan assists Kid Omega in preventing Red Onslaught's telepathy from affecting the combined combatants. In the energy released when the Scarlet Witch and Doctor Doom use the combined power of order and chaos spells to suppress the Red Skull's personality in favor of the sliver of Professor X's that still exists in his brain, Evan ascends to adulthood, stepping out of the rubble with a looming, muscular body and the presence and appearance of Apocalypse. Deadpool even comments on how changed Evan is. When Havok and Cyclops argue with Steve Rogers and the new Captain America over who should take custody of the body of Red Skull, Evan convinces the Summers brothers that Professor X is dead and they have other problems to deal with.

Acting as Apocalypse, 'En' vows to lead the mutants in an uprising, rallying the converted X-Men into helping him take Avengers Tower—now disregarded by the inverted Avengers after they captured almost all other heroes using Pym particles—to use as the site where he will detonate a Celestial-based 'gene-bomb' to wipe out all humans not carrying the X-gene. With only the inverted villains present at the original confrontation to oppose the inverted X-Men and Avengers, the gene bomb is nearly detonated, but is contained thanks to the sacrifice of Carnage. As Apocalypse broods on his failure, the decapitated Deadpool—converted to a peaceful version of himself by the inversion—convinces Apocalypse that now is the time to be heroic, proclaiming that nobody liked En Sabah Nur but everyone appreciated Evan, as he represented the hope that nurture could beat nature. Inspired by Deadpool's words, Apocalypse turns on the X-Men and the Avengers, allowing the Astonishing Avengers (along with non-inverted heroes Steve Rogers and Spider-Man) to retrieve the White Skull and undo the inversion. At the conclusion of the storyline, Evan is shown on the run with Deadpool.

Apocalypse Wars
During the Apocalypse Wars, the Extraordinary X-Men travel thousands of years into Earth's future in order to rescue Colossus and his team of young mutants after they were investigating the sudden appearance of six hundred new mutant signatures in Tokyo. Arriving into Earth's future, the X-Men found themselves in a destroyed New York City and soon discovered that at some point Apocalypse had risen and what remained of Earth after his ascension became the Omega World, a huge structure composed of bubble worlds. The ones who survived the Great Trials lived on Omega World under Apocalypse's rule as he functioned as the Omega World's heart, keeping it alive, while his Horsemen functioned as its antibodies, cleansing the structure of anything that could harm their master. Omega World crumbled as the result of Apocalypse being fatally wounded by Nightcrawler. Storm was forced to take Apocalypse back to the present with them so they could undo the transformation of Colossus, who was turned into a Horseman, however, before he could restore Colossus back to normal, Apocalypse instead teleported him away, sending him to Clan Akkaba. It's left unknown if this Apocalypse was actually a future version of Evan or Apocalypse himself using a new host body.
Apocalypse was kept at X-Haven, inside a cell specially built to contain him by Forge, and later after again retrieving Colossus, Forge tried to find a way to cure him by reverse engineering Apocalypse's powers but failed. During the World-Eater's attack on Limbo, Nightcrawler agreed to free Apocalypse in exchange for a cure for his friend. After returning Colossus to his normal self, Nightcrawler indeed released Apocalypse from his prison, however what Apocalypse didn't expect was that Nightcrawler would throw him into the vortex created by the World-Eater to consume Limbo, seemingly killing him in the process.

Degeneration
Apocalypse is later revealed to be back on Earth, no details about what the Celestials did to him were revealed, and is shown performing experiments to create an immortal vessel which he can then use as a host for his vast power and consciousness by utilizing a modified ancient Celestial technology known as the Finch, which can repair genetic decay. His efforts are not in vain, as he begins to impose his own consciousness onto a human test subject, the fourth attempt, lending it his own regenerative powers to withstand the assault. However, the test subject resists the process, causing a massive chain reaction that bathes Apocalypse and the subject in a wave of energy. Apocalypse's mind and body are torn apart. He finds his mind wandering to that of his birth before his being is fused, mixed, and exploded along with this human form. Once the wave subsides, Apocalypse finds himself in a strange new land that he deduces was the result of the explosion within the Celestial machine that must have caused a dimensional rift which threw him into another dimension. He also discovers that his body has changed as well. Not only does he discover that he can bleed, something that should be impossible with his injury-resistant mutant physiology, but after a fight against a resident of the twisted dimension, which he was able to defeat, Apocalypse learns that his body is actively refusing physiological mutation. Needing to breathe air for the first time in centuries, he comes to a shocking truth as he watches his hand turn from its usual mutated appearance back to a human form: he's becoming human. After degenerating into an ape form, he is taken out by his previous human test subjects who, unlike him, have ascended in form after being empowered by Apocalypse's own DNA. He and other apes are tortured with the Finch, which was recovered and repaired by the human test subjects. When test subject D experiments on Apocalypse, he uses the last of his mutant power to try to transfer his mind into D and is finally able to possess him, which restores Apocalypse to his former glory and realizes that he had not been transported to another planet, rather the earlier explosion from the Finch had simply evolved his entire South American island, infusing his superior genetics into everything the blast wave struck, transforming it into the tribulation which he had been forced to endure. Apocalypse then gave his perfect host body a trial run as he killed the remaining test subjects, while reducing the entire island to rubble that was reclaimed by the sea.

Apocalypse was soon afterward captured by some mysterious force - later to be revealed as X-Man, Nate Grey - and was being held captive along with Kitty Pryde and anti-mutant senator Ashton Allen.

Dawn of X
During Dawn of X, Apocalypse accepts Xavier's invite to enter Krakoa and even is among the Quiet Council, a group of fourteen powerful and experienced mutants who serve as the island's lawgivers. He takes up learning magic and acts as an advisor to the new Excalibur team. He appears to have devised a way to restore the powers of those who were depowered by Scarlet Witch's spell, but to do so, these ex-mutants need to prove themselves as worthy to get their powers back. Therefore, Apocalypse created the "Crucible", a trial by combat to death, where the ex-mutant is expected to lose in order to pass all while Apocalypse goads them about the weakness the loss of their powers created.

Its also revealed that at an uncertain point in the distant past apparently before En Sabah Nur merged himself with the Celestial technology, he met and married his wife Genesis. Together with Genesis' sister Isca they found and populated a living island known as Okkara. As time passed he and Genesis conceived four children, two sons and two daughters who eventually became their First Horsemen when the island was split by a force wielding the Twilight Sword. The mutant population were then led by Apocalypse and his family to fight the invading Daemons coming from the hellish reality of Amenth. During the war, the enemies' leader Annihilation tried to make a peace treaty with the mutants by offering a gift to them, but only if they would pass a test first. Genesis seemed to easily pass the test, but the gift Annihilation whispered to Genesis was not revealed. In the end, Genesis, the Horsemen, and Arakko decided to move to Amenth in order to hold off the Amenthi forces and deny Annihilation access to Earth by sealing the chasm, while leaving Apocalypse behind, since he wasn't strong enough, much to his and Krakoa's sorrow. However, before Genesis went to Amenth, she made Apocalypse promise to find and judge the succeeding mutants in following years in order to help them fight the threat.

Powers and abilities
Apocalypse is an ancient mutant who further augmented himself after merging with Celestial technology gaining in the process a variety of superhuman abilities. He is also among the rare subspecies of mutants that possess the additional gift of immortality. He has total control over the molecules of his body which enables him to alter his form as it suits him, such as allowing his body to become extremely malleable and flexible, enhance his physical abilities, transform his limbs into weapons, wings, or jets, regenerate from fatal injuries, generate a wide range of powers at will, and adapt his body to apparently any disease or hostile environment. He can also project and absorb energy and is capable of technopathy, being able to directly interface with the various technologies he has at his disposal. Thanks to the aid of his mutant abilities allowing him complete control over his body, special "regeneration" chambers, Celestial technology, and changing bodies, Apocalypse has further enhanced his abilities and now he can generate almost any mutant power at his will.

Aside from his superhuman powers, Apocalypse is extraordinarily intelligent and a scientific genius with knowledge in various areas of science and technology including physics, engineering, genetics, and biology, all of which are more advanced than conventional science. Apocalypse has knowledge of Celestial technology that he uses for his own applications, such as altering mutants or humans. Apocalypse is also a skilled demagogue and a master strategist.

Apocalypse's blood can heal other mutants, but is fatal for humans. Apocalypse's blood can also restore his de-powered mutant descendants as is seen when a large dose of Apocalypse's blood regenerates the lost body part of Chamber and gave him a look similar to Apocalypse.

In the film X-Men: Apocalypse, his powers are portrayed slightly differently. Like most so-called "Class 5 Mutants," Apocalypse is near-godlike in his abilities and their applications. Among his more aggressive powers is the apparent ability to create objects (including enormous buildings and structures but also clothing, weapons, armor, etc.) from dust within seconds and also to turn objects into dust, also within seconds. Another of his major powers is his ability to enhance and extend the powers of other mutants, a power he uses very selectively and chiefly as a means to recruit co-conspirators for his plans for world domination. The mutants whose powers he enhances are sometimes taken with him as one of his 'horsemen' or apprentices and eventual acolytes, and are treated as his children; however, even in such a role, a given mutant might suddenly be deemed unfit by Apocalypse and ejected from his confidence, at any time.

Reception
 In 2017, WhatCulture ranked Apocalypse 1st in their "10 Most Evil X-Men Villains" list.
 In 2018, CBR.com ranked Apocalypse 1st in their "Age Of Apocalypse: The 30 Strongest Characters In Marvel's Coolest Alternate World" list.
 In 2018, CBR.com ranked Apocalypse second in their "20 Most Powerful Mutants From The '80s" list.

Other versions

The character appears in a number of What If...? issues.

In the "Age of Apocalypse" storyline, Apocalypse awakens ten years before Cable would arrive, witnessing the accidental death of Charles Xavier by his son, attacks humanity and conquers much of the Earth. In this universe, his son is alleged to be Holocaust/Nemesis.

In the Mutant X universe, Apocalypse is an ally of the X-Men.

The Ultimate Marvel imprint title features an alternate version of Apocalypse who is an entity worshiped by Sinister. After completing a series of murders, Sinister is transformed into Apocalypse who intends to conquer the planet. The heroes are unable to defeat him until the Phoenix Force appears and destroys him. Although his abilities are never directly stated in total, he is shown to be capable of negating other mutant powers, adapting mutant powers into his own by exposure to them and "evolving" as he is fought. Following a heavy assault by the X-Men, Fantastic Four, and S.H.I.E.L.D. forces, he emerges from an explosion in a red and silver version of his traditional blue cybernetic battle armor. He is also capable of adapting to and overcoming Professor Xavier's psychic assault despite his training during his time in the future with Cable. Cable makes the most concrete implication that evolving is the major element of his powers when he remarks that Xavier must kill Apocalypse quickly before he adapts to his attacks and becomes immune to the telepathy. Apocalypse is finally dispelled by Phoenix while leaving an alive Mr. Sinister. His actual nature is unknown: he proclaims himself to be the first mutant (like in the mainstream series) and Phoenix readings portray him as an ancient being, but this is later contradicted by Nick Fury's revelation in Ultimatum, that explains mutants are a recent creation of the humans. However he later appears again as part of Sinister's psychosis.

In the House of M universe created by Scarlet Witch, Apocalypse was installed as the ruler of North Africa by Magneto. He was apparently killed by Black Bolt after a failed attempt to assassinate King T'Challa at Magneto's behest.

In the 2010 "Heroic Age" storyline, versions of Apocalypse and his Horsemen from a possible future appear in the Avengers Tower after Kang breaks time itself. After a fight with the Avengers, he and his Horsemen disappear.

In a future timeline seen in the 2009 storyline "Messiah War", a greatly weakened Apocalypse is attacked by Stryfe and Bishop, but he survives the attack. Afterward, Apocalypse contacts Archangel in the future and begs him to kill him. Archangel refuses and instead hands over some of his techno organic wing blades to him, telling Apocalypse he no longer holds any control over him. Coming into contact with the blades rejuvenates Apocalypse and he offers to join forces with Archangel to kill Stryfe who is on the verge of killing X-Force, Cable, Bishop, as well as Hope Summers. Archangel takes Apocalypse to a Celestial ship, where Apocalypse is then fully restored and wants to avenge what Stryfe did to him. Just as Stryfe is on the verge of taking Hope for himself, Apocalypse and Archangel confront and defeat Stryfe. Apocalypse releases Hope into Cable's care, but says that he will return for her eventually. Apocalypse then drags Stryfe away, intending to use him as a new host body. Stryfe manages to escape and travels back in time to the present.

In other media

See also
 List of Marvel Comics characters
 Bibliography of Apocalypse

References

External links
 
 Unofficial En Sabah Nur aka Apocalypse
 

Characters created by Jackson Guice
Villains in animated television series
Characters created by Louise Simonson
Comics characters introduced in 1986
Fictional ancient Egyptians
Fictional characters with absorption or parasitic abilities
Fictional characters with elemental transmutation abilities
Fictional characters with energy-manipulation abilities
Fictional characters with healing abilities
Fictional characters with spirit possession or body swapping abilities
Fictional characters with superhuman durability or invulnerability
Fictional characters with immortality
Fictional generals
Fictional kings
Fictional mass murderers
Fictional soldiers
Fictional technopaths
Fictional warlords
Male film villains
Marvel Comics characters who are shapeshifters
Marvel Comics characters who can move at superhuman speeds
Marvel Comics characters who can teleport
Marvel Comics characters who have mental powers
Marvel Comics characters with accelerated healing
Marvel Comics characters with superhuman senses
Marvel Comics characters with superhuman strength
Marvel Comics cyborgs
Marvel Comics film characters
Marvel Comics male supervillains
Marvel Comics mutants
Marvel Comics scientists
Marvel Comics telekinetics
Marvel Comics telepaths
Video game bosses
X-Men supporting characters